French Politics, Culture & Society is a peer-reviewed academic journal published by Berghahn Books on behalf of the Conference Group on French Politics & Society (sponsored jointly by the Minda de Gunzburg Center for European Studies at Harvard University and the Institute of French Studies at New York University). It covers modern and contemporary France from the perspectives of the social sciences, history, and cultural analysis. It also explores the relationship of France to the rest of the world, especially Europe, the United States, and the former French colonies. The editor-in-chief is Herrick Chapman.

Abstracting and indexing 
French Politics, Culture & Society is indexed and abstracted in:
 America: History and Life
 British Humanities Index
 Columbia International Affairs Online
 Educational Resources Information Center
 Historical Abstracts
 InfoTrac
 International Bibliography of Book Reviews of Scholarly Literature on the Humanities and Social Sciences
 International Bibliography of Periodical Literature
 International Political Science Abstracts
 MLA International Bibliography
 Sociological Abstracts
 Worldwide Political Science Abstracts

External links 

Sociology journals
Political science journals
Triannual journals
English-language journals
Multilingual journals
French studies journals
Harvard University academic journals
Berghahn Books academic journals